Johann Samuel Arnhold (22 December 1766 – 1 January 1828) was a German painter.

He was born at Heinitz, a village near Meissen, and studied in the Art School of the Porcelain factory of Meissen, of which he subsequently became professor. He was also court painter in Dresden. He painted in oil and water-colours, and on porcelain and enamel. His pictures sometimes represented landscapes and hunting scenes, but he is chiefly famous for his fruit and flower pieces.

See also
 List of German painters

References
 

18th-century German painters
18th-century German male artists
German male painters
19th-century German painters
19th-century German male artists
Porcelain painters
People from Meissen
1766 births
1828 deaths
Court painters